Jerry Hilgenberg was a football player and coach for the University of Iowa.  He was a first team All-American in 1953 and served as an assistant coach to the Iowa football team for eight seasons.

Background

Jerry Hilgenberg attended Wilton Junction High School in Wilton, Iowa.  Wilton Junction did not even have a football program until his senior year, so Hilgenberg played just one season as a high school running back.  Despite that, he was inducted into the Iowa High School Football Players Hall of Fame.  He walked on to Leonard Raffensperger’s Iowa football team in 1950 as a quarterback but was quickly converted to the center and linebacker positions.

Iowa career

Hilgenberg started at Iowa for three seasons from 1951-1953.  In his senior season in 1953, Iowa finished the year ranked in the top ten in the nation for the first time since the Ironmen in 1939.  Jerry Hilgenberg played a large role in that, being named a first team All-American after the season.  He was Coach Forest Evashevski’s first All-American at Iowa.  He was also the captain of the baseball team as a senior.

Hilgenberg was drafted by the National Football League’s Cleveland Browns, but he was also drafted by the U.S. Air Force, halting his pro career.  When he returned from service, he was hired as an Iowa assistant football coach from 1956-1963.  During that time, the Hawkeyes won three Big Ten conference titles and two Rose Bowls.  Jerry Hilgenberg was also able to coach his younger brother, Wally Hilgenberg.  Wally became a star both for the Hawkeyes and the Minnesota Vikings.

Honors

Two of Jerry Hilgenberg’s sons, Joel Hilgenberg and Jay Hilgenberg, became very successful players at the University of Iowa and in the NFL.  In 1989, Iowa fans selected an all-time University of Iowa football team during the 100th anniversary celebration of Iowa football, and Jerry Hilgenberg was selected as an offensive lineman.  He was inducted into the University of Iowa Athletics Hall of Fame in 1995, and his brother and two sons were inducted eight years later.

References

Iowa Hawkeyes football players
Living people
People from Wilton, Iowa
Year of birth missing (living people)